Patrick Thomas is an American actor. Thomas has had roles in several TV shows and movies. He has also done voice acting. He also goes by the aliases Pat Thomas, Puppy Thomas, and Courtney Burr.

Filmography

Film

Television

External links

Living people
American male film actors
American male television actors
American male voice actors
American people of Austrian descent
American people of Russian descent
Male actors from San Francisco
20th-century American male actors
21st-century American male actors
Year of birth missing (living people)